Manuk Napinadar or Chicken Napinadar is typical Batak cuisine in Indonesia that is usually served at certain customary feasts.

The sauce uses chicken blood. The chicken should be baked first, then watered with the blood of a chicken special sauce (Manuk) and mixed with andaliman and garlic powder and then cooked.

See also

 Babi panggang
 Batak cuisine

References
 Kuliner Khas Batak
 ayam napinadar

Batak cuisine